Stanisław Czesław Wziątek (born 13 November 1959 in Połczyn Zdrój) is a Polish politician. He was elected to Sejm on 25 September 2005, getting 8887 votes in 40 Koszalin district as a candidate from Democratic Left Alliance list.

See also
Members of Polish Sejm 2005-2007

External links
Stanisław Wziątek - parliamentary page - includes declarations of interest, voting record, and transcripts of speeches.

1959 births
Living people
Democratic Left Alliance politicians
Members of the Polish Sejm 2005–2007
Kazimierz Wielki University in Bydgoszcz alumni
Members of the Polish Sejm 2007–2011
Members of the Polish Sejm 2011–2015
People from Połczyn-Zdrój